You're a Sweetheart is a 1937 American musical film directed by David Butler and starring Alice Faye, George Murphy and Ken Murray. The film was produced and distributed by Universal Pictures who loaned Alice Faye from 20th Century Fox to headline the case. It was remade in 1943 under the title Cowboy in Manhattan.

You're a Sweetheart was nominated for an Academy Award for Best Art Direction by Jack Otterson.

Plot
A big and important Broadway theatre producer is opening his new big show. He is alarmed when he discovers his new show opens on the same night as a charity convention. He decides to lie about the tickets already being sold, so the show will be more alluring.

Cast
 Alice Faye as Betty Bradley
 George Murphy as Hal Adams
 Ken Murray as Don King
 Charles Winninger as Cherokee Charlie
 Andy Devine as Daisy Day
 William Gargan as Fred Edwards
 Frank Jenks as Harry Howe
 Frances Hunt as Penny
 Tony Labriola as Oswald
 Casper Reardon as Cousin Caspar
 Donald Meek as Conway Jeeters
 David Oliver as Yes Man
 A.A. Trimble as 	Will Rogers
 Edna Sedgewick as Ballet Dancer
 Bob Murphy as 	Bailiff
 Renie Riano as Mrs. Hepplethwaite
 Wade Boteler as Cop 
 Virginia Sale as 	Gawking Wife at Opening 
 Constance Moore as Bit Role

Production
Universal paid 20th Century Fox $40,000 to use Alice Faye plus $26,500 when filming was extended.

Songs
 You're a Sweetheart (Jimmy McHugh, Harold Adamson)
 Broadway Jamboree (Jimmy McHugh, Harold Adamson)
 My Fine Feathered Friend (Jimmy McHugh, Harold Adamson)
 Who Killed Maggie? (Jimmy McHugh, Harold Adamson)
 Oh, Oh, Oklahoma (Jimmy McHugh, Harold Adamson)
 So It's Love  (Mickey Bloom, Lou Bring, Arthur Quenzer)
 Scrapin' the Toast' (Murray Mencher (music), Charles Tobias (lyrics))

References

External links

1937 films
American black-and-white films
1930s English-language films
Films directed by David Butler
1937 musical films
American musical films
Films set in New York City
Universal Pictures films
1930s American films